"Dem Boyz" is the first single from Boyz n da Hood's self-titled debut album.

The song reached number 56 on the Billboard Hot 100, number 15 on the R&B/Hip-Hop Songs chart, and number 13 on the Rap Songs chart.

Charts

Weekly charts

Year-end charts

References

2005 debut singles
2005 songs
Bad Boy Records singles
Gangsta rap songs
Southern hip hop songs
Songs written by Jeezy
Trap music songs
Songs written by Nitti (producer)